Meridian Dawn is an international heavy metal band.

History 
The band was conceived by vocalist Antony Hämäläinen (Armageddon, Nightrage), drummer Johan Nunez (Kamelot, Nightrage, Firewind, Marty Friedman), guitarist Brandon Johnson, bassist/guitarist Nicholas Ziros (Into the Moat, Remembering Never), and guitarist Christopher "CJ" Cussell. Songs were written after about a year of file exchange as the majority of the band lived in different parts of the world. On 25 March 2014 the band released its first ever EP titled The Mixtape. It is a collection of five songs that were created in different studios, with different producers from both Sweden and the United States respectively.

On 1 June 2020, it was announced the band is ready to unleash its first full-length The Fever Syndrome. Longtime drummer Johan Nunez the only familiar face from the band's debut EP, provides a stellar and versatile drum performance that compliments the varied, yet cohesive, song writing. However, after some long and hard searching, the band decided on a stellar rhythm section for the future. Enlisting Ibrahim Hechavarria, Seth Funk (Leveled) and Nathan Bigelow (Arkaik, Singularity) to round out a new permanent line-up.

Engineered and mixed by Meridian Dawn and mastered once again by Jeff Cloyes (311, Lauryn Hill, Plies, Remembering Never), "The Fever Syndrome" was released 10 July 2020 in both digital streaming and limited deluxe digipack edition via Seeing Red Records.

Musical style
Meridian Dawn's music is generally considered a mixture of European death metal and melodic death metal. The Age of Metal observes "vocal contrasts between clean and guttural vocals are impressive, and the production value goes beyond expectation for an EP release". VarietyOfDeathZine commented the band "has a modern and melodic approach to metal while also being very heavily influenced by death metal which shows up mostly in the vocals."

Band members

Current line-up 
 Antony Hämäläinen - vocals (2012–present)
 Nicholas Ziros - lead guitar (2014–present), bass (2012–2014)
 Ibrahim Hechavarria - rhythm guitar (2020–present)
 Seth Funk - bass (2020–present)
 Nathan Bigelow - drums (2020–present)

Previous members 
 Christopher Cussell - guitars (2012–2014)
 Brandon Johnson - guitars (2012–2014)
 Johan Nunez - drums (2012–2020, session 2020)

Session members 
Jonah Weingarten - keyboards and orchestration (2021 session)

Discography

EPs 
 The Pagan Poetry EP (released: 30 April 2021 -  format: digital download)
 The Dissolving Bonds EP (released: 14 February 2021 -  format: digital download)
 The Mixtape EP (released: 25 March 2014 -  format: digital download)

Studio albums 
 The Fever Syndrome (released: 10 July 2020 -  format: CD, digital download)

Singles 
 Pagan Poetry (single) (released: 9 November 2020 -  format: digital download)
 The Moonlit Path (single) (released: 1 December 2020 -  format: digital download)
 Luminescent (single) (released: 14 July 2020 -  format: digital download)
 God To All (single) (released: 27 June 2020 -  format: digital download)
 Iconic (single) (released: 13 June 2020 -  format: digital download)

References

External links
 Meridian Dawn at Encyclopaedia Metallum

Finnish death metal musical groups
American death metal musical groups
Swedish melodic death metal musical groups
Musical groups established in 2010